Frobisher is an occupational surname, a variant form of 'furbisher', i.e. a person who 'furbishes' (burnishes) weapons and armour as part of the production process (Middle English fourbishour, from Old French forbisseor). Notable people with the surname include:

Benjamin Frobisher (1742–1787), Canadian fur trader
Benjamin Joseph Frobisher (1782–1821), Canadian fur trader and politician, son of Joseph Frobisher
Joseph Frobisher (1740–1810), Canadian fur trader and politician, brother of Benjamin and Thomas Frobisher
Martin Frobisher (c. 1535 – 1594), English sailor and explorer
Thomas Frobisher (1744–1788), Canadian fur trader, brother of Joseph and Benjamin Frobisher

Fictional characters:
Arthur Frobisher, villainous billionaire in the television series Damages
Buck Frobisher, character in the television series Due South
Robert Frobisher, composer in the novel Cloud Atlas and mentioned in other David Mitchell books

English-language surnames